Founder's Award, Founders' Award, or Founders Award may refer to any number of awards associated with an organization's founder or founders. These include:
 International Emmy: Founders Award
 Google Founders' Award
 Founder's Badge (Boys' Brigade in Malaysia)
 For the Order of the Arrow Founder's Award, see Honors and awards of the Order of the Arrow#Founder's Award
 For the Theater Hall of Fame Founders Award, see American Theatre Hall of Fame#Founders Award
 Founder's award of Women in Film Crystal + Lucy Awards